Allotrichia is a genus of insect belonging to the family Hydroptilidae.

The genus was first described by McLachlan in 1880.

The species of this genus are found in Europe.

Species:
 Allotrichia pallicornis

References

Hydroptilidae
Trichoptera genera